Japanese spotted fever  is a condition characterized by a rash that has early macules, and later, in some patients, petechiae.

It is caused by Rickettsia japonica.

See also 
 Flea-borne spotted fever
 Flinders Island spotted fever
 List of cutaneous conditions

References

External links 

Bacterium-related cutaneous conditions
Rickettsioses